David Brine (born January 6, 1985) is a Canadian-born Croatian professional ice hockey Centre who last played for Újpesti TE in the Erste Liga. Brine previously played for KHL Medveščak Zagreb of the Erste Bank Eishockey Liga.

Playing career
Brine spent three years with the Halifax Mooseheads of the Quebec Major Junior Hockey League, where he scored 100 points as a 20-year-old in 2005–06. He ended the season playing nine playoff games with the Manitoba Moose of the American Hockey League.

In 2006, Brine was a contestant on the Global reality series Making the Cut: Last Man Standing.  Though he did not win the series, Brine impressed Mike Keenan enough to earn a tryout with the Florida Panthers.  Signed as an undrafted free agent by the Panthers, Brine spent two years with the Panthers minor league affiliates before making his NHL debut with the Panthers on February 2, 2008.

After playing two years for KHL Medvescak Zagreb of the Austrian Erste Bank Eishockey Liga and their affiliate KHL Medvescak II of the Croatian Ice Hockey League, Brine signed with High1 of the Asian League for the 2013–14 season.

Career statistics

Regular season and playoffs

International

References

External links

1985 births
Aalborg Pirates players
Canadian expatriate ice hockey players in Austria
Canadian ice hockey centres
Cardiff Devils players
Florida Everblades players
Florida Panthers players
Halifax Mooseheads players
High1 players
Ice hockey people from Nova Scotia
KHL Medveščak Zagreb players
Living people
Löwen Frankfurt players
Manitoba Moose players
People from Truro, Nova Scotia
SC Riessersee players
Rochester Americans players
San Antonio Rampage players
Újpesti TE (ice hockey) players
HC Valpellice players
Undrafted National Hockey League players
Canadian expatriate ice hockey players in South Korea
Canadian expatriate ice hockey players in Wales
Canadian expatriate ice hockey players in Croatia
Canadian expatriate ice hockey players in Denmark
Canadian expatriate ice hockey players in Germany
Canadian expatriate ice hockey players in Hungary
Croatian expatriate sportspeople in Hungary
Canadian expatriate ice hockey players in the United States
Naturalized citizens of Croatia